Talkback with Jerry Galvin was a humorous radio talk show that aired first in Cincinnati, Ohio, on WAIF, and later was aired on 66 NPR stations.

Tonally, Talkback was a parody of America's traditional call-in radio talk shows of the early 1970's. Such shows in that era were always devoted to serious topics. In 1975 Jerry Galvin began a weekly program that used what he termed a "radio scam" as the show's theme each week. Each weekly show was launched with Galvin telling a stream-of-consciousness, unscripted  – often long and rambling – story about something that happened to him or about to happen to the listeners or to the world. The stories were never true. Once the phone lines were opened for comments, two distinct types of callers were heard. Those who got the joke and improvisationally advanced that night's fake story. And those upset or outraged by the story. Unlike its spiritual TV sister Fernwood 2-Night, a mostly scripted show with a crew of writers, Talkback was improvised. (Late Night with David Letterman, a real TV talk show which was finding its footing around the same time, had a similar parodical feel, but was somewhat reined in by its celebrity guest format.)

Host Galvin was a Cincinnati ad executive best known for teaming up with Jay Gilbert to create commercials promoting all Cincinnati radio stations with their imaginary Plummet Mall.

The Talkback "cast" consisted of several dozen regulars, many of whom would call weekly to play along with whatever phony topic or riff Jerry set up. After the show developed its stable of regular callers, shows would sometimes be built around the regulars themselves interacting, such as on-air wedding ceremonies between them.

Tipping his hand and hinting at the show's parodical nature, Jerry often described his clothing as "the same each day: Hush Puppy knockoffs, argyle socks, plaid Bermuda shorts, a Hawaiian shirt, and a pith helmet." Jerry often teased the station where his show originated by referring to WAIF as a station with a signal so weak the best reception was in the parking lot. He also described his most famous screener, Lynn Wendell as "Our Lady in Leather," wearing leather S&M gear (in contrast to most radio talk shows whose official on-air policy was not to mention the screener at all)--a reference to her toughness and tendency to hang up on anyone who didn't have a funny enough idea to keep the show moving.

In the 1980s after Talkback received a front page feature in the Wall Street Journal and was also featured on the Today Show, the program was nationally distributed to National Public Radio stations. The name of the show was changed to TalkTalk with Jerry Galvin after producers of a Los Angeles show named Talkback threatened a lawsuit.

The program underwent one more name change to "It's Those Stupid Galvins Again," when Jerry's brother Jene joined Jerry for the weekly programs that by then aired on WVXU in Cincinnati. The improvisational, scam-based format remained unchanged throughout the show's more than 30-year run.

References

American comedy radio programs